What Is Philosophy? is a book by the philosopher Martin Heidegger. It is the published version of a lecture course he gave at Cerisy-la-Salle in 1955.
It was translated into English by William Kluback and Jean T. Wilde.

See also
Metaphilosophy

References

1955 speeches
1956 non-fiction books
Books about metaphilosophy
Books by Martin Heidegger
Books of lectures
German non-fiction books
Metaphysics literature
Philosophy lectures